Athanasiou is a Greek surname. Notable people with the surname include:

Andreas Athanasiou (born 1994), Canadian ice hockey player
Grigorios Athanasiou (born 1984), Greek footballer
Kyriacos A. Athanasiou (born 1960), Cypriot-American bioengineer

Greek-language surnames